John Saul (1913–1979) was an Australian actor and director, one of the leading figures in Australian radio of the 1940s and 1950s. He was married to actress Georgie Sterling and was an early mentor of Rod Taylor. For many years he played Dave Rudd on radio in Dad and Dave from Snake Gully.

References

External links
John Saul theatre credits at AusStage

1913 births
1979 deaths
20th-century Australian male actors